Shooting Stars is the debut album by the pop duo Dollar.

Released in 1979, the album contained the duo's first three singles; "Shooting Star", "Who Were You With in the Moonlight" and "Love's Gotta Hold on Me". The album was released on Carrere Records and reached no.36 in the UK Albums Chart. Five of the nine tracks were written by Dollar members David Van Day and Thereza Bazar, the album was produced by Christopher Neil.

Track "Love Street" was released as a single after the group had left the label.  All of the tracks have been released on CD on various compilation albums.

Track listing
Side One
 "Overture" (Bazar / Van Day) – 2:21
 "Shooting Star" (David Courtney) – 3:48
 "Tokyo" (Bazar / Van Day) – 3:44
 "Star Control" (Bazar / Van Day) – 6:08
Side Two
 "Who Were You With in the Moonlight" (Courtney) – 4:02)
 "I Need Your Love" (Bazar / Van Day) – 3:54
 "Ring Ring" (Rainbow) – 3:01
 "Love's Gotta Hold on Me" (Bazar / Van Day) – 3:30
 "Love Street" (Bugatti / Musker) – 2:42

The Very Best of Dollar

Dollar left Carrere Records in early 1980 and signed to WEA Records where they went on to find even greater success. Eager to cash in on this, their original label re-released Shooting Stars as The Very Best of Dollar with a new cover and added track - their fourth and final hit with the label, "I Wanna Hold Your Hand". Another single, "Ring Ring" was released to coincide with the album, which clashed with Dollar's latest official single, "Give Me Back My Heart".  The album actually improved on its original chart performance, reaching no. 31, which was surprising considering that it featured none of Dollar's recent hits and received no promotion from the duo themselves. The album was certified Silver by the BPI later in the year.

Track listing
Side One
 "Who Were You With in the Moonlight" (Courtney) – 4:02
 "I Need Your Love" (Bazar / Van Day) – 3:54
 "Ring Ring" (Rainbow) – 3:01
 "Love's Gotta Hold on Me" (Bazar / Van Day) – 3:30
 "Love Street" (Bugatti / Musker) – 2:42

Side Two
 "Overture" (Bazar / Van Day) – 2:21
 "Shooting Star" (Courtney) – 3:48
 "Tokyo" (Bazar / Van Day) – 3:44
 "Star Control" (Bazar / Van Day) – 6:08
 "I Wanna Hold Your Hand" (Lennon / McCartney) – 3:00

Chart performance

References

1979 debut albums
1982 albums
Albums produced by Christopher Neil
Dollar (band) albums